Mauricio Bolaños (born 16 January 1939) is a former Salvadoran cyclist. He competed in the individual road race and the team time trial events at the 1968 Summer Olympics.

References

External links
 

1939 births
Living people
Salvadoran male cyclists
Olympic cyclists of El Salvador
Cyclists at the 1968 Summer Olympics
Sportspeople from San Salvador